The Olean City School District is a public school district located in Olean, New York. It includes two elementary schools, which serve grades Kindergarten-Grade 3:

 East View Elementary School (Built in 1973)
 Washington West Elementary School (Built in 1960)

There is a middle school known as the Olean Intermediate Middle School, serving grades 4–7. The former Olean Junior High school, now defunct, was built on the site of a former glass factory.

There is one high school known as the Olean High School. The school serves grades 8–12. Olean High School is known for a notable school shooting.

At Olean's population peak in the 1950s, the Olean City School District included 13 schools.

2012-2013 Restructuring
Olean City School District was restructured for the 2012–2013 school year due to the State of New York imposing a maximum property tax increase beginning in 2012.  
This caused major school changes:
Olean High School was changed to an 8-12 school.
Boardmanville Elementary School was closed.
Ivers J. Norton Elementary School was closed.
Olean Middle School was renamed "Olean Intermediate-Middle School," and became an intermediate school for grades 4–7.

References

External links 
 http://schooldesigns.com/Project-Details.aspx?Project_ID=1647
 http://www.gabrielamericanrealty.com/vintageoleanpage.html
 http://www.oleantimesherald.com/news/article_5dbff612-595c-11e1-bc51-0019bb2963f4.html

Education in Cattaraugus County, New York
School districts in New York (state)